The University of Hawaiʻi Maui College (UHMC) is a public college in Kahului, Hawaii on the island of Maui.  It is one of ten branches of the University of Hawaiʻi system and is accredited by the Western Association of Schools and Colleges.

In addition to its main campus in Kahului, UHMC also runs four education centers within Maui County: Lahaina Education Center in Lahaina and Hāna Education Center in Hāna; Molokai Education Center on the island of Molokai; and Lānai Education Center on the island of Lānai.

History
The University of Hawaii, Maui College was founded in 1931 as the Maui Vocational School. In 1958 its name was changed to Maui Technical School. The college was incorporated into the University of Hawaii System on July 1, 1965, after the Hawaii State Legislature enacted the Community College Act which established a statewide community college system under the UH System.

In 1966 its name was changed to Maui Community College after the UH Board of Regents authorized the college to confer degrees in Associates in Arts and Associates in Science.

In Spring of 2010, the Western Association of Schools and Colleges (WASC) Accreditation Board approved the name change from Maui Community College to University of Hawaii Maui College. The name change was changed in order to provide a more accurate reflection of UH Maui College's three baccalaureate degrees.

Campus

Campus Buildings

Kaaike
Laulima
Hookipa
Ka Lama
Kūpaa
The Learning Center
Noii
Ike Lea
Pāina
Pilina

Off-Campus

Campus Art
Campus art includes:
 Alakahi, coral sculpture by Peter Bal, 1976
 Maui, wood and metal sculpture by Kim Chung, 1973
 Na Moku Ekolu (Three Islands), cast and welded silicon bronze sculpture by Sean K. L. Browne, 1985
 Wind and Sea, bronze sculpture by Bruce Turnbull, 1992
 Dolphin, stainless steel sculpture by Linlee Boulet, Eric T. Sato, Gwen Brush and John Ringer, 1987

Academics
UHMC offers associate degrees, Bachelor of Applied Science degrees, and certificates.

References

External links

 Official website

Community colleges in Hawaii
University of Hawaiʻi
Education in Maui County, Hawaii
Schools accredited by the Western Association of Schools and Colleges
Buildings and structures in Maui County, Hawaii
Educational institutions established in 1931
1931 establishments in Hawaii